Scott Michael Elrod (born February 10, 1975) is an American actor.

Early life
Elrod was born into an American military family in Bitburg, Germany. After moving around the Philippines with his family, he was raised in Parker, Colorado. His father was an F-16 pilot and Elrod wanted to become a pilot himself. He earned his pilot license after graduation and became an air traffic controller.

Career

After seeing the film Top Gun, Elrod decided to become an actor. He relocated to Los Angeles, in April 2004, to pursue a career in acting. Eventually, his performances in small parts in CSI: NY, Days of Our Lives, and the “Nothing In This World” music video by Paris Hilton, brought him to the attention of the casting crew of Men in Trees, in which he played the part of Anne Heche's friend, occasional roommate, and sometimes love interest "Cash". In 2013, he starred in the films Home Run and Lone Survivor. In 2016 he played Meredith's new man in Grey's Anatomy. On August 1, 2016, he was cast as celebrity Travis Brenner in Chicago Fire.

Personal life
In December 2015, Elrod announced he and fiancée, Vanessa Vazart, were expecting a child together. Their son, Easton, was born in June 2016.

Filmography

References

External links
 Scott Elrod Official Website
 Scott Elrod Online Official Fansite
 

1975 births
American male television actors
21st-century American male actors
Living people
Male actors from Colorado
People from Parker, Colorado
Air traffic controllers